Klinck is a surname. Notable people with the surname include:

 Anne Klinck, Canadian literary historian and academic
 Carl Klinck (1908–1990), Canadian literary historian and academic
 Leonard Klinck (1877–1969), second President of University of British Columbia
 Matthiew Klinck (born 1978), director and producer
 Todd Klinck (born 1974), writer and pornography producer

See also
 Klink